Bartlett Whitney Robinson (December 9, 1912 – March 26, 1986) was an American actor who performed on radio, the stage, in films, and on television for five decades. In 1943 he was the first actor of several performers who provided the voice of the title character on the radio version of Perry Mason.  Later, as a character actor in films and on television, he was often cast in roles of authority figures, such as military officers, wealthy ranchers, corporate executives, doctors, and judges.  Robinson appeared in 21 films from 1956 to 1973 and in over 110 television productions between 1949 and 1982.  He was also credited as Bart Robinson.

Early life, radio and stage
Bartlett Robinson was born in Manhattan, New York, on December 9, 1912.  He began his career in entertainment in 1933 when he and his friends formed a performance group called the "Sunday Players," who later drove across country together to Los Angeles, California, in hopes of finding steady work. There Robinson subsequently got a job in the city at radio station KFI.  For the remainder of the 1930s and into the 1940s, Robinson traveled back and forth between New York and Los Angeles to take parts in both stage and radio productions. Some of his roles in old-time radio programs included the following:

Robinson was cast in stage productions for two decades and appeared in plays with stars such as Henry Fonda and Lillian Gish.  He would continue to be active in theater well into the 1950s.  A few of his Broadway credits are Naughty Naught '00 (1936), Sweet River (1936), Dear Ruth (1944), The Girl in Pink Tights (1953), and The Prescott Proposals (1953).

Film and television career
By the late 1940s and throughout the 1950s, Robinson began to focus his acting career on productions in the rapidly expanding medium of television and on film projects.  On June 13, 1949, he appeared on television in "Light Up the Sky", an episode on the anthology series Ford Theatre.  He made his film debut playing the part of a guest in the 1956 comedy The Birds and the Bees, which starred George Gobel, Mitzi Gaynor and David Niven.  Earlier, he had appeared in other television episodes, including Ski Story on the Armstrong Circle Theatre, which aired 13 January 1953.  Among others television series, he made guest appearances in seven episodes of Gunsmoke (1956 -1960). Robinson made guest appearances in eight episodes of Alfred Hitchcock Presents (1958 - 1962), six episodes of Perry Mason (1959 - 1966) and three episodes of The Twilight Zone (1961 - 1962). He played the role of Frank Caldwell in 26 episodes of Mona McCluskey  (1965–1966) and appeared in many other episodes, predominantly in supporting roles.

A particularly lengthy part was in Maverick (1957) with a Robert Louis Stevenson adventure titled "The Wrecker" starring James Garner and Jack Kelly in which he portrayed "Longhurst," a top hat-wearing head of a financial group with the inside track on buying ships in San Francisco.  In 1970 Robinson appeared as Doctor on "The Men From Shiloh" (rebranded name for The Virginian in the episode titled "Hannah."

Robinson's last appearance on television was in the episode "Law" on the television series Lou Grant, which aired on April 12, 1982.  In that episode he played Jacob Bauman, a character he had already portrayed on the series in a 1979 episode titled "Witness".  With regard to the "big screen," his final credited role was that of Dr. Orva in Woody Allen's 1973 film Sleeper.

Personal life and death
Bartlett Robinson married Margaret (Margot) Ballantine in 1938.  The couple had two children and remained wedded for 33 years, until their divorce in 1971.  They later remarried, a union that lasted until 1986 when he died of cancer at home in Fallbrook, California.

Film and television credits

Films

Television

References

External links
 
 
 
 Bartlett Robinson at Aveleyman
 
 
 

1912 births
1986 deaths
American male radio actors
American male film actors
American male stage actors
American male television actors
20th-century American male actors